"Refugees as weapons", or "Weapon of Mass Migration" is a term used to describe a hostile government organizing, or threatening to organize, a sudden influx of refugees into another country or political entity with the intent of causing political disturbances in that entity. The responsible country (or sometimes a non-state actor) usually seeks to extract concessions from the targeted country and achieve some political, military, and/or economic objective.

Definitions

Migration Infiltration

Illegal immigration to the United States 
U.S. President Donald Trump has emphasized U.S. border security and illegal immigration to the United States as a campaign issue. During his announcement speech, he notably said that "Mexico sends its people [to the United States]". Since, Trump wall with Executive Order 13767 summarized in 2017 Mexico–United States diplomatic crisis to reinforce the Mexico–United States barrier.

Islamist militants among Refugees 
Immigration has been used as a cover by ISIL militants disguised as refugees or migrants.

Case studies suggest that the threat of an Islamist refugee Trojan House is highly exaggerated. Of the 800,000 refugees vetted through the resettlement program in the United States between 2001 and 2016, only five were subsequently arrested on terrorism charges; and 17 of the 600,000 Iraqis and Syrians who arrived in Germany in 2015 were investigated for terrorism. One study found that European jihadists tend to be 'homegrown': over 90% were residents of a European country and 60% had European citizenship.

Threat to use force against Refugees 
The threat to use conventional or non -onventional weapons by a state on refugees under the protection of the opposing force. There are two intertwined positions. Refugees are special civilian target under the "protection" of a state or a UNHCR camp (such as de-escalation/safe zone established during Syrian peace process by the Syrian Civil War ceasefires). The psychological, health, and logistical implications of refugees running away from a real or perceived CBRN environment toward a contracting state or the UNHCR camp.

Responding to such a crisis associated with the purposeful introduction would require military forces with the skills necessary in consequence management, and operate in what promises to be a very complex and chaotic environment. CBRN defense; CBRNE Enhanced Response Force Package is an initiative of the United States National Guard designed to integrate existing national guard units into the broader federal and local civilian emergency response personnel. The United States military U.S. Army Center for Army Lessons Learned released a handbook entitled "Commander's Guide to Support Operations Among Weaponized Displaced Persons, Refugees, and Evacuees". The handbook, provides a basic overview of considerations and methods of reaction should CBRN warfare be executed using dislocated civilians.

Migration Coercion 
Migration coercion is the utilization, or threatens to utilize, migration as an instrument to induce behavioral changes, or to gain concessions from the receiving target. In 1966, Teitelbaum and Weiner stated that in foreign policy governments create mass migrations as a tool to achieve non migrant goals.

An example during Afghanistan conflict (1978–present) is Soviet attempt to influence Pakistani decision-making by driving Afghans to seek asylum across the Durand Line.

Operation Peter Pan & Rafter crisis 
Cuban exiles are fled from or left the island of Cuba after the Cuban Revolution of 1959.

Between November 1960 and October 1962, over 14,000 children were sent to the U.S. by their parents with Operation Peter Pan in response to the CIA and Cuban dissidents spreading rumors of a project by the castrist government to remove the parents' custody of their children to indoctrinate them. Authors John Scanlan and Gilburt Loescher note how the United States acceptance of Cuban emigrants after the 1959 Cuban Revolution was done in hopes they could help the United States forcibly remove the Fidel Castro government from Cuba. The acceptance of Cuban emigrants during the Freedom Flights was done in hopes of weakening the Cuban economy by draining it of workers. The United States also was generally able to paint a negative picture of Cuba by participating in the mass emigration of many who disliked Cuba and wished to flee the island. The Department of State painted Cuban emigrants in the 1960s as freedom-seeking refugees. The United States had lost its total aggressive foreign policy towards Cuba and instead viewed the island as a nuisance rather than a security threat after the Mariel boatlift. The Mariel boatlift was soon canceled after it was initiated and received little public American support. The 1994 Cuban rafter crisis was the emigration of more than 35,000 Cubans to the United States via makeshift rafts. In response to the crisis Bill Clinton would enact the Wet feet, dry feet policy where only Cuban rafters that make it to U.S. soil will be allowed to remain. The U.S. will also only approve 20,000 immigration visas a year for Cubans.

Fidel Castro benefited from the exile because he was able to remove disloyalty by directly removing disloyal citizens from Cuba, which is #Migration Exportive. Fidel Castro after sending more than 100,000 Cuban migrants (including criminals and the mentally disabled) to Florida, coerced the United States into foreign policy concessions.

Forced labor flow 

North Korea send abroad laborers (controlled by the state) to work, which the United Nations estimate the income generated is between $1.2 and $2.3 billion annually to the state.

Diaspora Tax 
The Eritrean regime levies a 2% tax on citizens abroad (Eritrean diaspora) which failure results in the inability to obtain or maintain critical documents, such as birth certificates, marriage certificates, or passports.

In December 2011, The UN Security Council expanded the previous sanctions of 2009 through "United Nations Security Council Resolution 2023", mainly demanding for two things: Eritrea should cease to apply the coercive element on collecting diaspora tax, and it should stop using the collected revenue to destabilized the whole region of the Horn.

Defensive use of border barrier 
Turkey has deployed separation barriers along the insecure regions of its internationally recognized borders, which is a border barrier, such as Iran–Turkey barrier, Syria–Turkey barrier. The Syria–Turkey barrier is a  border wall and fence excluding natural barriers such as river beds along the  Syria–Turkey border, aimed at preventing illegal crossings and smuggling.

The border barrier is built to be mobile. There are 120 lookout towers along Syria border. A security road runs along the wall.

Move refugees to a "Safe zone" 
One solution is implementing a safe zone in Syria. Turkey is involved in four ceasefire areas established in Syria in order to halt the fighting.

Move refugees to a "safe country" 
The European Commission proposed a common EU list designating as 'safe' all EU candidate countries (Albania, Macedonia, Montenegro, Serbia and Turkey), plus potential EU candidates Bosnia and Herzegovina and Kosovo.

The 2015 EU-Turkey Joint Action Plan designated Turkey as a "safe country" status.

Military 
Military operations for neutralising refugee smuggling routes. 
Operation Triton
Operation Sophia
Operation Sovereign Borders

Defensive use of smartphone metadata  
Wired claimed refugees are being faced with a mobile forensics industry which provides information that can turned against the refugees in EU constituent states.

As of 2018, Germany and Denmark expanded laws and Belgium and Austria in the works for expanding laws, while the UK and Norway didn't have limitations on immigration officials to extract data from refugee phones. The Dublin Regulation is a European Union (EU) law that determines which EU Member State is responsible for the examination of an application for asylum, and the EURODAC Regulation, which establishes a Europe-wide fingerprinting database for unauthorised entrants to the EU. All these branches that gather refugee data unite under the Schengen Information System, which is used by 31 European countries to find information about individuals and entities for the purposes of national security, border control and law enforcement.

Several cases or alleged cases

Second Libyan Civil War 
The Second Libyan Civil War was an ongoing conflict among rival factions seeking control of the territory and oil of Libya. Refugees of the Libyan Civil War are the people, predominantly Libyans, who fled or were expelled from their homes during the Libyan Civil War, from within the borders of Libya to the neighbouring states of Tunisia, Egypt and Chad, as well as to European countries across the Mediterranean. Libya's  is a transit point for North Africans seeking entry to Europe.

During the 2011 Libyan civil war, Muammar Gaddafi warned the European Union of consequences should it continue supporting the protesters.

Syrian Civil War 
The Syrian Civil War is a multi-sided civil war in Syria fought between the Ba'athist Syrian Arab Republic led by President Bashar al-Assad, along with domestic and foreign allies, and various domestic and foreign forces opposing both the Syrian government and each other in varying combinations. NATO's four-star General in the United States Air Force  commander in Europe stated on the issue of indiscriminate weapons used by Bashar al-Assad, and the non-precision use of weapons by the Russian forces - are the reason which cause refugees to be on the move.

Iran 
In Iran, President Mahmoud Ahmadinejad expelled a number of displaced Afghans seeking refuge in Iran since 1979 to back to Afghanistan to stop United States operations (CIA).

Great Lakes refugee crisis 
The Great Lakes refugee crisis the exodus of over two million Rwandans to neighboring countries of the Great Lakes region of Africa. Many of the refugees were Hutu ethnics fleeing the predominantly Tutsi Rwandan Patriotic Front (RPF), which had gained control of the country at the end of the Rwandan genocide.

Reversal of this process is the repatriation of the refugees, which is the process of returning to their place of origin or citizenship. That happened after the First Congo War, when RPF-supported rebels invaded Zaire.

South Ossetia 
The Russo-Georgian War was between Georgia, Russia and the Russian-backed self-proclaimed republics of South Ossetia and Abkhazia. The war took place in August 2008 following a period of worsening relations between Russia and Georgia, both formerly constituent republics of the Soviet Union. The fighting took place in the strategically important Transcaucasia region. Humanitarian impact of the Russo-Georgian War was devastating on the civilians. In the aftermath, ethnic Georgians were expelled from South Ossetia and most of the Georgian villages were razed. Ethnic cleansing of Georgians in South Ossetia was a mass expulsion of ethnic Georgians conducted in South Ossetia and other territories occupied by Russian and South Ossetian forces. According to the 2016 census conducted by the South Ossetian authorities, 3,966 ethnic Georgians remained in the breakaway territory, constituting 7% of the region's total population of 53,532.

Russia is pushing for the international recognition of Abkhazia and South Ossetia (will be satellite states). Abkhazia and South Ossetia are disputed territories in the Caucasus. The central government of Georgia considers the republics under military occupation by Russia. They are partially recognized as independent states by Russia, Venezuela, Nicaragua, Nauru and Syria. Russia's initial recognition of the independence of Abkhazia and South Ossetia occurred in the aftermath of the Russo-Georgian War in 2008.

Hong Kong 
83,000 Chinese with fake identities migrated to Hong Kong during transition from British to Chinese control, they served as Beijing's “invisible hand”.

Indonesia 
In 2006 the Indonesian Army manipulated the voyage to Australia of 43 West Papuan asylum seekers in a secret psychological warfare operation. between 2009 and 2013, more than 50,000 asylum seeker made their way to Australia by boat, with the help of Indonesian transporters and in 2017 it was discovered that Indonesian security forces provided security for immigrant smuggling operations.  
In 2015 Indonesia minister warned Australia, Indonesia could release a “human tsunami” of 10,000 asylum seekers to Australia if Canberra continues to agitate for clemency for the death row pair on bali Nine

Turkey 
In late February 2020 migrants started to gather at the Greece–Turkey border after Turkish president Recep Tayyip Erdoğan announced that he would not longer "block" refugees and migrants' "access to the border", and opened the border with Greece. Turkey's government was accused of pushing refugees into Europe for political and monetary gain.

Belarus

President of Belarus Alexander Lukashenko has been accused by Germany and the European Union of weaponising the flow of Middle Eastern refugees into Poland, as revenge for European Union sanctions against his government.

European migrant crisis 
The European migrant crisis is a period beginning in 2015 characterised by high numbers of people arriving in the European Union (EU) from across the Mediterranean Sea or overland through Southeast Europe. According to the United Nations High Commissioner for Refugees, the top three nationalities of entrants of the over one million Mediterranean Sea arrivals between January 2015 and March 2016 were Syrian (46.7 percent), Afghan (20.9 percent) and Iraqi (9.4 percent).

The Valletta Summit on Migration was a summit held on 11–12 November 2015, in which European and African leaders discussed the European migrant crisis. The summit resulted in the EU setting up an Emergency Trust Fund to promote development in Africa, in return for African countries to help out in the crisis.

Turkish-Syrian migrant crisis 
Turkey's migrant crisis or Turkey's refugee crisis is a period during 2010s characterized by high numbers of people arriving in Turkey. As reported by the Turkish government and the UNHCR in 2019, Turkey is hosting 65% of all the Syrian Civil War refugees in the region, that is 3,663,863 registered Syrian refugees in total.

Refugees of the Syrian Civil War in Turkey are the Syrian refugees originated from Syrian Civil War, Turkey is hosting over 3.6 million in 2019. As of 2019, the return of refugees of the Syrian Civil War is uncertain. Turkey has focused on how to manage their presence, more registered refugees than any other country, in Turkish society by addressing their legal status, basic needs, employment, education, and impact on local communities.

Further reading 
 Weapons of Mass Migration: Forced Displacement, Coercion, and Foreign Policy, Cornell University Press, 2011.

References

Warfare by type
Weapons
Security
Economic warfare tactics